Allin Kempthorne (born 1972) is a British actor, magician and entertainer. As a magician he works under three distinct identities as Alan Thorn, Professor Strange (with which he appeared on the television show Britain's Got Talent) and Gizmo. He was originally a tabloid newspaper cartoonist. He directed and starred in the comedy film The Vampires of Bloody Island and was shortlisted in the 2012 Twitter Shorty Awards.

Career
Kempthorne started his career as a joke writer and cartoonist for The Sun, The Mirror, and News of the World newspapers. He later enrolled at a circus school where he learned various physical comedy acts. He became a street performer in London's Covent Garden, and won several performance awards. He was a finalist for the International Street Entertainer of the Year Award and won the Tap Water comedy award. He later enrolled in drama school and started a dual career as an entertainer and as an actor.

Kempthorne formed the comedy act The Fabulous Trouser Brothers with American comedy performer David Wolf, Kempthorne being primarily a juggler and Wolf a magician. The pair started appearing on television in the UK and United States. This partnership ended abruptly with David's suicide three years into their partnership. Kempthorne then became a solo comedy act, Dweebie the Robot, having a few appearances on television including Blue Peter and Spanish Archer'.

In 2009 he directed his first feature film, The Vampires of Bloody Island in which he also starred.
As a live performer he specialises in magic and comedy. He appears at festivals, theme parks, holiday parks, corporate events and cruise ships as the cabaret magician Alan Thorn, the Steampunk magician Professor Strange and also with his comedy children's show as Gizmo with which he has been televised by the BBC.

From 2012 to 2014 he played Cornish comedian Eddie Twist in the television series "Twisted Britain" for which he was also the principal writer.

In 2018 he notably featured in the UK television series Britain's Got Talent as Steampunk magician Professor Strange. He was also hired by Britain's Got Talent judge Amanda Holden to perform a magic show for her daughter's birthday.

During the COVID-19 Pandemic of 2020 he set up Santa's Hotline, a service where children could enjoy magic shows and meeting Santa Claus online using Zoom.

Magician
Allin Kempthorne performs magic and circus acts as a Steampunk Victorian styled character Professor Strange. He performs acts as a cabaret comedy magician and a children's magician on cruise ships, holiday parks and corporate events and also as a close-up magician at weddings, dinners and exhibitions.
He also works as a magician under the name Alan Thorn, a simplification of his real name.
Originally a juggler trained at The Circus Space (Now the National Centre for Circus Arts), Allin was initially taught magic by Edinburgh based magicians Paul Wilson and Ian Kendal while living in Edinburgh in his early twenties, during which time he worked at a juggling equipment shop.
In more recent years he furthered his magical training at the McBride Magic & Mystery School in Las Vegas, Nevada, being personally tutored by noted magicians Jeff McBride and Eugene Burger.

He has performed at the home of the American Ambassador to the United Kingdom, that of Virgin founder Richard Branson, the Houses of Parliament, Harrods and many shopping centres and corporate events. He is a life member of the International Magicians Society.
In 2018 he featured in the television series Britain's Got Talent as Steampunk magician Professor Strange. There was an awkward moment as judge Amanda Holden failed to recognize him although she had previously hired him to perform at her daughter's birthday party. Simon Cowell said his son Eric might quite like his act and joked about booking him for his next birthday. However he did not get the required votes to get through to the next round.
As Professor Strange he won the combined Welsh & Scottish heat to become a finalist in the 2022 UK Family Entertainer of the Year Competition held at Blackpool Magic Convention, the world's biggest annual magic convention.

The Vampires of Bloody Island
Allin and his wife Pamela both wrote and produced the comedy horror feature film The Vampires of Bloody Island in which they both played main parts. The film was released in the UK in 2009 and in the US in 2010.
He cites the book The Guerilla Film Makers Handbook as being influential in helping him with the screenwriting and pre-production processes of the film.
A version of the script was published titled The Vampires of Bloody Island, The Complete Movie Screenplay and is available as an e-book on the Kindle and on Amazon in the US, UK, France, Spain, Germany and Italy. The first 11 scenes can be read for free.
In January 2013 The Vampires of Bloody Island was shown at the Horror-on-Sea Film Festival.

The Weird World of Wibbell
Allin and his wife Pamela formed the film production and distribution label The Weird World of Wibbell to make their 2006 feature film The Vampires of Bloody Island. The film company went on to release other films including Learning Hebrew: A Gothsploitation Movie and is working on a documentary on the history of vaudeville performers The First Stars of Vaudeville which Allin wrote and presents.

Theatre
In September 2014 he appeared in the play Lippy at the Irish Arts Centre in New York City, after the play was well received at the Dublin Arts Festival.

In 2008 he toured with comedian Lee Evans in his stand-up comedy show Big.

In 2016 he played Marvin Acme in a two-month run of Who Framed Roger Rabbit at The Troxy in East London. For the role he also performed some magic tricks.

Filmography as actor
 Johnny English Reborn Black Mirror John Bishop's Britain Horrible Histories The Vampires of Bloody Island Star Stories Dead Set Lee Evans: Big Live at the O2 Hotel Babylon The Riddle Nuclear Secrets The Lavender List Seconds from Disaster The Big Impression Innocents The Armando Iannucci Shows The Life and Adventures of Nicholas Nickleby The Borrowers Harry Potter and the Order of the Phoenix Harry Potter and the Goblet of Fire Johnny English Silent Cry Spider Twisted Britain The End of the Affair Merlin Britain's Got TalentFilmography as director
 The Vampires of Bloody IslandFilmography as producer
 The Vampires of Bloody Island Learning Hebrew: A Gothsploitation MovieFilmography as screen writer
 The Vampires of Bloody Island Don't Give Up Your Day Job BBC Scotland (Parts)
 Twisted BritainPublications
 1989 The Daily Mail Guide To Working From Home – Cartoonist
 1990 Agiliwriting – Cartoonist
 1992 The Gordons Guide To Juggling – Author and Cartoonist
 2011 The Vampires of Bloody Island, The Complete Movie Screenplay – Author

Contributing writer and cartoonist
A prolific cartoonist in his twenties, his cartoons were published daily in the British tabloid newspapers. He also wrote and drew the regular strips How to Succeed in Circus for The Catch magazine and Starface for Zit comic.
 The Sun The Sunday Sport The Daily Mirror The News of The World The Daily Star Bella Magazine The Catch Magazine Gutter Comic Zit Spit!''

References

External links 

 
 

English male comedians
English writers
English entertainers
English magicians
British magicians
English cartoonists
British directors
Living people
English male film actors
English male television actors
1972 births